In several sports, most prominently association football, a league cup or secondary cup generally signifies a cup competition for which entry is restricted only to teams in a particular league. The first national association football tournament to be called "League Cup" was held in Scotland in 1946–47 and was entitled the Scottish League Cup. However, in the Republic of Ireland the now-defunct League of Ireland Shield was the first national league-only tournament of its kind (played first in 1921); this was subsequently replaced by the League of Ireland Cup in 1983.

The creation of a league cup marked the difference from the association cup or primary cup, which is generally also open to teams from multiple leagues, often as far down as regional amateur leagues, and who are also members of the country's football association. League cups are less prevalent than primary cups.

The creation of a tournament of this kind exclusively for the top national-level league teams, in addition to the two main domestic association football tournaments of the league and association cup, also created a new national footballing achievement called the domestic "treble". The first national league treble of this kind was won by Shamrock Rovers of the Republic of Ireland in 1925.

League cups were generally introduced after the Second World War – for example, the Football League Cup in England in 1960 – although in other countries they were created following a rise in the number of floodlit stadiums, allowing regular midweek matches.

In certain countries, the league cup had, or in some cases still has, group stages in the early stages. These often opened the season before the main league season began.

List of league cups and secondary cups in association football

Men's league cups

Africa
  Algerian League Cup
  KPL Top 8 Cup
 
 MTN 8 – first tier
 Telkom Knockout – second tier

Asia

Canale Cup – regional competition
 Indonesia President's Cup
 J.League Cup
 Jordan FA Shield
 Kuwait Federation Cup
 Lebanese Elite Cup
 Malaysia Cup
 Oman Professional League Cup
 Qatari Stars Cup
 Thai League Cup
 UAE League Cup

Europe

EFL Cup (formerly the Football League Cup) – first tier
EFL Trophy (formerly the Football League Trophy) – second tier
Isthmian League Cup – regional competition
Northern Premier League Challenge Cup – regional competition
Northern Premier League President's Cup – regional competition
Southern Football League Cup – regional competition
 Finnish League Cup
 Icelandic League Cup
 League of Ireland Cup
 Toto Cup
 Irish League Cup
 Taça da Liga
 FNL Cup

Scottish League Cup – first tier
Scottish Challenge Cup – second tier
 Welsh League Cup

North America
 
 Trinidad and Tobago League Cup
 Trinidad and Tobago Pro Bowl
  /  /  Leagues Cup

South America
 Copa de la Liga Profesional
 Torneo Intermedio

Women's league cups

Europe
 
 WSL Cup — first tier
 WPL Cup — second tier
  Icelandic League Cup
  Taça da Liga Feminina
  SWPL Cup

North America
  NWSL Challenge Cup

Asia
  WE League Cup

Defunct league cups and secondary cups

Men's league cups

Africa
 Egyptian League Cup
 Tunisia Coupe de la Ligue Professionel

Asia

NSL Cup – first tier
NNSWF State Cup – regional competition
 Chinese Super League Cup
 Iraqi Elite Cup
 Japan Soccer League Cup, Konica Cup
 UFL Cup
 Korean League Cup

Europe
 Belgian League Cup
 Spar Cup, Danish League Cup, Viasat Cup
 Olympia-Pokal (1964), Fuwo-Pokal (1972), DFV-Toto-Sonderrunde (1974 and 1976)
 Full Members Cup, Super Cup, Centenary Trophy, Conference League Cup
 Coupe Charles Drago
 Coupe de la Ligue
 DFL-Ligapokal
 Gibraltar Premier Cup
 Greek League Cup
 Virsligas Winter Cup 
 Norwegian League Cup
 Young Leaders Rally Cup (1952), League Cup (1977 and 1978), Polish League Cup (1999–2002), Ekstraklasa Cup (2006–2009)
 Federation Cup
 Cupa Ligii
 Russian Premier League Cup
 Saint Mungo Cup, Summer Cup, Southern League Cup
 All-Union Committee of Physical Culture and Sports Tournament (1952), USSR Federation Cup
 Copa de la Liga
 Swiss League Cup
 Spor Toto Cup
 Ukrainian Second League Cup (a preliminary tournament for the Ukrainian Cup that involved third tier teams along with best teams of Ukrainian Amateur Cup; the Ukrainian League Cup was a single season supplemental tournament for the third tier teams of 2009–10 Ukrainian Second League and involved participation of some reserve and amateur teams)
 FAW Premier Cup

South America
 Copa de la Superliga

Women's league cups

Asia
 Nadeshiko League Cup
 PFF Women's Cup

League cups and secondary cups in other sports

Basketball

Men's league cups 
  LNB Pro A Leaders Cup
  LNB Pro B Leaders Cup
  BBL Cup (includes only British Basketball League teams)
  Icelandic League Cup (includes top two league levels)
  Israeli Basketball State Cup (includes the top two levels, the Premier League and National League)
  Israeli Basketball League Cup (separate cups for the Premier League and National League)
  Coppa Italia (Serie A)
  LNP Cup
  Portuguese League Cup
  KSS Cup (Second League)
  Copa Princesa de Asturias (LEB Oro [second level])
  SBL Cup

Women's league cups 
  Icelandic League Cup (includes top two league levels)
  WNBA Commissioner's Cup

References